Robert "Bobbie" van de Graaf (born 17 March 1944) is a retired Dutch rower who won a bronze medal in the coxed fours at the 1964 Summer Olympics. His team mates were Marius Klumperbeek (cox), Lex Mullink, Freek van de Graaff and Jan van de Graaff. The latter two were also born in 1944 and are unrelated to Bobbie.

References

External links

 
 
 

1944 births
Living people
Dutch male rowers
Olympic rowers of the Netherlands
Rowers at the 1964 Summer Olympics
Olympic bronze medalists for the Netherlands
Sportspeople from Macclesfield
Olympic medalists in rowing
Medalists at the 1964 Summer Olympics
20th-century Dutch people
21st-century Dutch people